Mulhern House was an historic home located at Wappingers Falls in Dutchess County, New York.  It was built about 1815 and was a two-story, frame double residence.  Also on the property was a contributing shed.  It is the only workers' residence that survived intact from the initial period of industrial development at Wappingers Falls.  The building was destroyed in a gas explosion in February 1994. A residential building was subsequently constructed on the property at the end of Market St. where it intersects with Franklin and Fulton Streets.

It was added to the National Register of Historic Places in 1987.

References

Houses on the National Register of Historic Places in New York (state)
Houses completed in 1815
Houses in Dutchess County, New York
Wappingers Falls, New York
National Register of Historic Places in Dutchess County, New York